Aske Leth Andrésen (born 16 July 2005) is a Danish professional footballer who plays as a goalkeeper for Danish Superliga club Silkeborg IF.

Career

Silkeborg
Andrésen came to Silkeborg IF from Ry Fodbold as U13 player. He worked his way up through the youth ranks and on 24 October 2021, 16-year old Andrésen was called up for his first professional game; a Danish Superliga game against OB. However, he remained on the bench for the whole game. Andrésen got his official debut on 2 October 2022 against AC Horsens, after first choice goalkeeper, Nicolai Larsen, got injured shortly before the break. 17-year-old Andrésen became the youngest goalkeeper ever in the Danish Superliga history.

References

External links

Aske Andrésen at DBU

2005 births
Living people
Danish men's footballers
Association football goalkeepers
Denmark youth international footballers
Danish Superliga players
Silkeborg IF players